Murchison is a city in Henderson County, Texas, United States. The population was 594 at the 2010 census.

Geography

Murchison is located northeast of the center of Henderson County at  (32.278405, –95.755179). Texas State Highway 31 passes through the center of town, leading southwest  to Athens, the county seat, and east  to Tyler.

Demographics

At the 2000 census there were 592 people in 217 households, including 161 families, in the city. The population density was 373.9 people per square mile (144.7/km). There were 238 housing units at an average density of 150.3/sq mi (58.2/km).  The racial makeup of the city was 94.93% White, 0.17% African American, 0.51% Native American, 0.17% Asian, 3.55% from other races, and 0.68% from two or more races. Hispanic or Latino of any race were 6.08%.

Of the 217 households 31.3% had children under the age of 18 living with them, 60.8% were married couples living together, 10.6% had a female householder with no husband present, and 25.8% were non-families. 21.7% of households were one person and 14.7% were one person aged 65 or older. The average household size was 2.73 and the average family size was 3.14.

The age distribution was 29.9% under the age of 18, 8.8% from 18 to 24, 23.3% from 25 to 44, 24.2% from 45 to 64, and 13.9% 65 or older. The median age was 35 years. For every 100 females, there were 87.9 males. For every 100 females age 18 and over, there were 82.0 males.

The median household income was $33,281 and the median family income  was $36,071. Males had a median income of $30,938 versus $17,500 for females. The per capita income for the city was $14,986. About 15.7% of families and 20.0% of the population were below the poverty line, including 28.3% of those under age 18 and 23.5% of those age 65 or over.

Education
Public education in the city of Murchison is provided by the Murchison Independent School District.

References

Cities in Texas
Cities in Henderson County, Texas